Traci Lords is an American actress, singer, writer, producer and director. After having appeared in dozens of pornographic films between 1984 and 1986 while she was underage, Lords made a transition to mainstream films. She made her mainstream screen debut in Not of This Earth (1988), a remake of Roger Corman's 1957 film of the same name, playing the leading role of Nadine Story. She followed with Fast Food (1989) and the John Waters' teen comedy, Cry-Baby (1990), where she appeared alongside Johnny Depp. The film received positive reviews and the part of Wanda Woodward remains Lords' most notable role. Around the same time, she also appeared in many television series, including Wiseguy, MacGyver, Married... with Children, Highlander and Tales from the Crypt.

In the early 1990s, Lords starred in various independent and B movies, such as Shock 'Em Dead, Raw Nerve, A Time to Die (1991), Intent to Kill (1992) and Skinner (1993). She also appeared in the television adaptation of Stephen King's novel The Tommyknockers. In 1995, while promoting her debut studio album 1000 Fires, Lords landed the role of Rikki Abbott on the television series Melrose Place and also appeared in three episodes of Roseanne. Lords was a recurring cast member on the crime series Profiler and had a small part in the vampire action film Blade (1998). She kept on making more films and appeared in more television series, including First Wave, Gilmore Girls and Will & Grace. Her role in the 2000 comedy Chump Change earned her the Film Discovery Jury Award for Best Actress at the U.S. Comedy Arts Festival.

In 2008, Lords appeared as Bubbles in the Kevin Smith comedy Zack and Miri Make a Porno. She also had supporting roles in horror films, Excision (2012) and Devil May Call (2013). Her portrayal of Phyllis, a hyperreligious and controlling mother, in Excision earned her several awards including the Fangoria Chainsaw Award for Best Supporting Actress as well as Fright Meter Award and CinEuphoria Award.

Film

Television

Music video appearances

Video games

Notable adult videos
 1984 What Gets Me Hot! as Lannie (her first adult movie; credited as Tracy Lords)
 1984 The Sex Goddess as Marilyn
 1984 Talk Dirty to Me Part III as Mermaid (later reissued with Lords' scenes replaced by new scenes featuring Lisa De Leeuw)
 1984 Those Young Girls as Traci
 1984 Sister Dearest (later reissued as Back To Class with Lords' scenes edited out)
 1985 Wild Things as School Girl
 1985 The Adventures of Tracy Dick: The Case of the Missing Stiff as Tracy Dick (credited as Tracy Lords)
 1985 Educating Mandy as Mandy (scenes are used in the comedy From Beijing with Love by Stephen Chow, as the "painkiller" when he was undergoing the operation for bullet removal)
 1985 Holly Does Hollywood as Tracy
 1985 Black Throat as Debbie
 1985 Electric Blue 28 as Nikki (scenes deleted)
 1985 Future Voyeur
 1985 Harlequin Affair (credited as Tracy Lords)
 1985 Hollywood Heartbreakers
 1985 Kinky Business (later reissued with Lords' scenes deleted)
 1985 It's My Body as Maggie
 1985 New Wave Hookers as The Devil (later reissued with Lords' scene deleted)
 1985 Perfect Fit as Diane
 1985 The Grafenberg Spot (aka The G-Spot) credited as Tracy Lords
 1986 Traci Takes Tokyo as Traci (currently banned in the U.S.)
 1986 Beverly Hills Copulator as Michelle Leon (credited as Tracy Lords)
 1986 Traci, I Love You, Traci Lords' last pornographic film and her only one featuring all of her scenes intact that is legally available in the U.S., as it was made two days after her 18th birthday.

References

External links
 
 
 

Actress filmographies
Filmography
American filmographies